The Dewoitine D.720 T3 was a French reconnaissance/cooperation aircraft built by Dewoitine in the late 1930s.

Design and development
In 1937 the Service Technique de l'Aéronautique (STAe) issued a specification for a three-seat reconnaissance / Army co-operation, T3-(Triplace de Travail), aircraft, to fulfil several roles, including tactical reconnaissance, army co-operation, light bomber and crew trainer.

Development was started at Dewoitine, but the company was soon absorbed into the nationalised Société Nationale de Constructions Aéronautiques du Midi, where development continued. The design of the first aircraft, designated D.700 T3, began in January 1938 and construction was started in May 1938. The STAe altered the requirements soon after assembly began, stipulating that the observer be moved from a ventral gondola to the nose of the aircraft. The engines were also changed from two  Renault 6Q engines to two  Renault 12R-00 V-12 engines and the new aircraft was re-designated D.720 T3.

The D.720 was constructed largely of wood with fabric and ply-wood veneer skinning, with a rectangular section fuselage housing the crew in two glazed cockpits. The observer sat in the nose under extensive glazing, the pilot and co-pilot sat in tandem behind the observer in a separate glazed cockpit. Provision was made in the centre fuselage, behind the co-pilots position, for an oblique F30 of F50 or ventral F70 camera, or a Type F and two Type J racks for light bombs. The shoulder mounted wings were also built from wood with mostly ply skinning, supporting the two engine nacelles which housed the retractable main undercarriage and the two  Renault 12R engines, driving 3-bladed variable-pitch propellers. The tail unit had a cantilever tailplane with end-plate fins.

Defensive armament, specified in the revised requirement to fulfill the crew training role, consisted of four hand trained MAC 34 machine guns, one each in nose and ventral positions, with two in a SAMMA B33 dorsal turret.

Operational history
The prototype was first flown on 10 July 1939, at Toulouse-Francazals, by Marcel Doret and after the manufacturer's flight tests, was flown to the Centre d'Essais du Matériel Aérien (CEMA) at Orléans-Bricy on 25  September 1939. Deliveries of the Potez 630 were ramping up by this time and the Potez 63.16 T3 crew trainer, was going to be available in a much shorter time-frame, leading to abandonment of the D.730.

Variants
D.700The aircraft as originally specified by the STAe, powered by  Renault 6Q engines, with a ventral gondola for the observer; not built.
D.720The first prototype to the up-dated specification, powered by  Renault 12R-00 engines, with the observer moved to the nose; one bult.

Specifications (D.720)

References

Further reading
 

D.720
1930s French military reconnaissance aircraft
Aircraft first flown in 1939
High-wing aircraft